The 2016–17 Armenian First League was the 26th season of the Armenian First League, Armenia's second tier football competition. It began on 8 August 2016 and finished on 30 May 2017. Alashkert-2 were the defending champions.

Teams

A total of 8 teams participated in this edition of the Armenian First League.

League table

See also
 2016–17 Armenian Premier League
 2016–17 Armenian Cup

References

Armenian First League seasons
2016–17 in Armenian football
Armenia